The 2016 Chatham Cup was New Zealand's 89th annual knockout football competition.

The 2016 competition had a preliminary round, a qualification round, and four rounds proper before quarter-finals, semi-finals, and a final. The final, played on 11 September 2016, was won for the first time, by Auckland's Birkenhead United, who beat Waitakere City 3–2 in extra time. The Jack Batty Memorial Trophy for man of the final was won by Birkenheard's Tom Davis.

Results
All results and dates are taken from the following sources: The Ultimate New Zealand Soccer Website, RSSSF and Soccerway.

Preliminary round

Northern Region

Southern Region

All teams listed below received byes to the first round.
Northern Region: Albany United Football Club, Bay Olympic, Birkenhead United FC, Central United FC, Claudelands Rovers, East Coast Bays AFC, Eastern Suburbs AFC, Ellerslie AFC, Forrest Hill Milford AFC, Franklin United, Fencibles United AFC, Glenfield Rovers, Hamilton Wanderers FC, Hibiscus Coast AFC, Mangere United Soccer Club, Manukau City AFC, Manurewa AFC, Melville United AFC, Metro FC, Mt Albert Ponsonby, North Shore United AFC, Onehunga Mangere United, Ngaruawahia United AFC, Onehunga Sports, Oratia United, Papakura City FC, Papatoetoe AFC, Royal NZ Navy, Takapuna AFC, Tauranga City United FC, Te Atatu AFC, Three Kings United, Waitakere City AFC, Western Springs AFC
Central/Capital Region: Brooklyn Northern United, Eastbourne AFC, Island Bay United AFC, Lower Hutt City AFC, Kapiti Coast United, Marist AFC, Miramar Rangers AFC, North Wellington Association Football Club, Petone, Seatoun AFC, Stop Out Sports Club, Stokes Valley Football Club, Tawa AFC, Victoria University of Wellington, AFC Wairarapa United, Wainuiomata AFC, Wellington United, Wellington Olympic, Western Suburbs, Upper Hutt City, Devon Homes Wanganui Athletic, Gisborne Thistle, Havelock North Wanderers AFC, Massey University FC, Moturoa AFC, Napier City Rovers, New Plymouth Rangers AFC, Palmerston North Marist.
Mainland/Southern Region: Caversham AFC, Dunedin Technical AFC, Grant Braes, Green Island AFC, Queens Park AFC, Northern AFC, Northern Hearts AFC, Old Boys AFC, Otago University, Mornington AFC, Mosgiel AFC, Roslyn Wakari AFC, Queenstown Rovers, Burwood AFC, Cashmere Technical, Coastal Spirit FC, FC Nelson, FC Twenty 11, Ferrymead Bays, Halswell United AFC, Nomads United, Parklands United, Selwyn United FC, Richmond Athletic AFC, Wakefield FC, Western AFC, Waimak United FC, Universities.

Round 1
Northern Region

Central / Capital Region

Mainland Region

Southern Region

*The match between Ngaruawahia and Mangere was originally an on-field 3–0 win for Mangere but they were deemed to have fielded an ineligible player and the result was overturn to a 3–0 loss instead. Ngaruawahia progressed to round two.

All teams listed below received byes to the second round.
Northern Region: Bay Olympic, Birkenhead United, Central United, East Coast Bays, Eastern Suburbs,  Forrest Hill-Milford United, Glenfield Rovers, Hamilton Wanderers, Melville United, Onehunga Sports, Tauranga City United, Three Kings United, Western Springs
Capital Region: Marist Palmerston North, Napier City Rovers

Round 2
Northern Region

Central / Capital Region

Mainland

Southern

Round 3
Northern Region

Central / Capital

Mainland / Southern

Round 4
Northern Region

Central / Capital

Mainland / Southern

Quarter-finals

Semi-finals

Final

References

External links
Chatham Cup on The Ultimate New Zealand Soccer Website
2016 Chatham Cup on RSSSF
Chatham Cup section on the New Zealand Football website 
Highlights of the final from Youtube.com

Chatham Cup
Chatham Cup
Chatham Cup
Chatham Cup
Chatham Cup